Sam Whittall (born 5 October 1993) is an English footballer who plays for  side Rushall Olympic, where he plays as a midfielder.

Playing career

Wolverhampton Wanderers
Whittall progressed through the academy of Wolverhampton Wanderers to sign professional contract in 2012. However, he never made a first team appearance for the club and was released at the end of the 2013–14 season.

Cambridge United
On 14 August 2014 he signed a six-month contract with League Two club Cambridge United. He made his senior debut on 19 August 2014, coming as a substitute in a 2–2 draw at York City.

Brackley Town
Whittall joined Brackley Town following his release by Cambridge United.

Stourbridge
In January 2016 Whittall signed for Stourbridge on a short-term deal until the end of the season.

Rushall Olympic
For the 2016–17 season, Whittall joined Rushall Olympic, then resigned with the club for the 2017–18 season, as well as 2018–19.

On 3 June 2022, Rushall Olympic confirmed that Whittall had re-signed with the club, and would see him make the 2022–23 season his seventh campaign with the club.

References

External links

1993 births
Living people
English footballers
Association football midfielders
Wolverhampton Wanderers F.C. players
Cambridge United F.C. players
Brackley Town F.C. players
English Football League players
Stourbridge F.C. players
Rushall Olympic F.C. players